Brandtocetus is a genus of cetotheriid mysticete in the subfamily Cetotheriinae. The type and only species is Brandtocetus chongulek from the late Miocene (Tortonian) of the Kerch Peninsula in Crimea.

Brandtocetus chongulek was a whale approximately 4–5 m long differing from all Cetotheriidae by having a transversely expanded lateral portion of the squamosal bone ; a rhomboid temporal fossa; an occipital shield extending anterior to the center of the temporal fossa; and an elongated posterior process of the tympanoperiotic with a proximodistally extended, and distally expanded, distal portion exposed as an oval surface on the posterolateral skull wall.

References 

Baleen whales
Miocene cetaceans
Prehistoric cetacean genera
Fossil taxa described in 2014
Miocene mammals of Europe